Didymanthus is a monotypic genus of flowering plants belonging to the family Amaranthaceae. The only species is Didymanthus roei.

Its native range is Southwestern Australia.

References

Amaranthaceae
Amaranthaceae genera
Monotypic Caryophyllales genera